The North American Interfaith Network (NAIN) is a non-profit association of Interfaith organizations and agencies in Canada, Mexico and the United States. NAIN's programs seek to build communication and mutual understanding among interfaith organizations and diverse religious groups throughout North America.

Through its annual conference, newsletter, web site, member organizations, Board and supportive participants, NAIN offers networking opportunities to person of many religious traditions and numerous interfaith organizations.

NAIN affirms humanity's diverse and historic spiritual resources, bringing these to bear on contemporary global, national, regional and local issues. Without infringing on the effort of existing organizations, NAIN facilitates the networking possibilities of these organizations. NAIN encourages cooperative interaction based on serving the needs and promoting the aspirations of all member groups.

NAIN Connect 
Since 1988 NAIN has held annual "Connect" conferences with host locations rotating throughout the member organizations. 2007 Connect was held in Richmond, Virginia, 2008 in San Francisco, California, 2009 in Kansas City, Missouri.  2010 Connect will be in Salt Lake, Utah.

NAINews 
Quarterly news and information on interfaith activity in North America.

External links
 North American Interfaith Network

Interfaith organizations